Aroga thoracealbella is a moth of the family Gelechiidae. It is found in North America, where it has been recorded from Texas.

The wings are brown, the forewings very faintly streaked with whitish towards the apex.

References

Moths described in 1874
Aroga
Moths of North America